Cheryl Pruitt is an American educator and advocate for alternative education. She was Superintendent of the Gary Community School Corporation from 2012 to 2018, and she has served in executive roles for several other organizations that seek to improve inequalities in traditional public education settings.

Career 
Pruitt was born in Gary, Indiana. Pruitt graduated from Rust College with a B.S., and the University of Memphis with a EdD. She began her career as a scientific researcher for substance abuse, and children's health, before she joined Memphis City Schools as a science teacher. She continued her teaching career in Memphis, Tennessee and Gary Indiana, before she served in various administrator roles.

In 2012, Pruitt was hired as the superintendent of the Gary Community School Corporation, after the school district sought to rectify years of financial imbalance. Given that the city of Gary, Indiana is known for having one of the country's highest rates of crime and debt since the 1990s, Pruitt spent her tenure primarily focused on disrupting the district's school to prison pipeline and renegotiating its contracts to lessen the financial debt. Under her leadership, the district's students achieved their highest literacy rates and lowest drop out rates in decades.

In 2015, state lawmakers forced the school administration to select an independent financial manager to oversee the district's finances and remove oversight from the board of trustees. Moreover, in 2017, the governor of Indiana signed a law to replace the school board's decision-making powers with a state-appointed emergency management team, also as a result of the district's persistently high financial debt. The event marked one of the only state takeovers of a public school system in the state of Indiana. Pruitt announced her resignation later in 2017.

In 2018, the state-appointed emergency management team requested multiple financial audits of the school district. As part of the audits, Pruitt was asked to return a $30,000 bonus that was awarded in 2016, due to a disagreement by state officials with the process used to approve the bonus by the school district's board of education. After Pruitt voluntarily agreed to return the bonus, she was also charged with theft and official misconduct, after allegedly submitting and receiving a reimbursement for a trip to an educational conference in 2016. The charges were dropped by prosecutors in June 2020.

Since resigning as Superintendent of Gary Community School Corp., Pruitt serves in several organizations that attempt to address inequities to improve the economic and social well-being of women and minorities in the United States.

References 

School superintendents in Indiana
People from Gary, Indiana
Rust College alumni
1963 births
Living people
21st-century American women educators
21st-century American educators
University of Memphis alumni

See also
Alternative Education